TVB Anywhere is an online pay-TV and shopping platform launched by Hong Kong television station Television Broadcasts Limited (TVB) for non-Hong Kong audience in 2016. It streams content from its TV channel via set-top box and mobile application. The service targets Overseas Chinese.

The set-top box service supports all overseas countries except for Mainland China, Hong Kong, Malaysia, Vietnam, United States and Canada; the mobile application named TVBAnywhere+ supports all overseas countries except for Mainland China, Hong Kong, Canada, United States and Vietnam.

Background 
Before TVB Anywhere, TVB launched similar products such as TVB Europe and TVB USA. Due to the use of illegal over-the-top (OTT) video set-top boxes and pirated video-streaming services in overseas markets, TVB launched TVB Anywhere to stop such actions. Since the launch of TVB Anywhere, it also replaces the satellite broadcasts by TVB Europe and TVB Australia.

For users in Hong Kong, myTV SUPER is a similar service, or they could watch TVB's free-to-air television channel.

On 26 October 2018, TVB Anywhere has launch in Singapore. But, there is no live TV and only available as a SVOD.

On 7 April 2020, TVB Anywhere has launched in USA as TVB Anywhere USA aimed at American audiences with live TV from Jadeworld's Channels and streaming video on demand.

List of channels

Current

 Asian Action Channel
 Horse Racing Channel 88 (not available in Macau and the other territories)
 KBS World (Canada, Australasia and Europe only)
 Mainland News Channel
 Phoenix Chinese Channel Australia (Australasia only)
 Phoenix Chinese News and Entertainment Channel (Europe only)
 Phoenix Hong Kong Channel (Canada only with U.S.A. version)
 Phoenix InfoNews Channel (not available of all other territories)
 Phoenix North America Chinese Channel (Canada only with U.S.A. version)
 SCTV 1 (Australia only)
 SCTV 7 (Australia only)
 SCTV 9 (Australia only)
 SCTV 14 (Australia only)
 Star Chinese Movies (Fairchild Pack as Canada only)
 TVBS Asia (Australia only)
 TVBS News (Australia only)
 TVB Classic Movies (not available in all other territories)
 TVB Entertainment News Channel
 TVB Finance & Information Channel
 TVBJ (Australia) (Australasia only)
 TVB Jade International
 TVB Korean Drama (Macau only)
 TVB Live Show
 TVB News Channel
 TVB Radio
 TVB Xing He

Great Wall TV

 Anhui TV International
 BTV International Channel
 CCTV-4
 CCTV Entertainment
 CCTV Chinese Opera
 CGTN Documentary
 Chongqing TV International
 Dragon TV (Global)
 Fujian Straits TV
 GRT World
 Guangxi TV International
 Great Wall Elite
 Hunan TV World
 Jiagsu TV International
 Shandong TV International
 Sichuan TV International
 Shenzhen TV (Global)
 TVS-2 (Global)
 Yunnan TV International
 Zhejiang TV International

See more 
 TVB
 TVB Europe
 TVB USA
 TVB Korea Channel

External links 
 Official website

References 

 
Television stations in Hong Kong
Mass media in Hong Kong